Perumpalloor is a village 4 km southeast of Muvattupuzha in the Ernakulam, Kerala, India. It is a small area in Arakuzha panchayat of Muvattupuzha taluk in the banks of the Thodupuzha river.

References

Villages in Ernakulam district